Ángel García, nicknamed Cabeza de Perro (born 1800) was a Spanish pirate. His nickname, "Cabeza de Perro" translates to English as Dog Head.

Biography 
Ángel García was born in Igueste de San Andrés, Tenerife, Spain in 1800.

As a pirate he conducted his operations in the Caribbean and lived in the district of San Lázaro, in La Habana, Cuba. His vessel was the brig El Invencible, although he also had others such as El Audaz, which he captured after organizing the killing of her crew.

This ship traveled between Havana to New York. He killed all his crew, except for a woman and her son (or daughter, according to other sources), who had gone into hiding. When both were discovered by the pirate, he threw them into the sea. However, they were rescued by an Italian sailing ship. The woman related the event to the captain and he showed her a portrait of Cabeza de Perro, recognizing him as the author of the massacre.

In the following days, the pirate Cabeza de Perro could not stop thinking about that terrible scene and decided to abandon his pirate activity and return to his homeland to dedicate himself to agriculture.

After arriving in Tenerife, he was arrested at Castillo de Paso Alto in Santa Cruz de Tenerife, where he was executed.

Historicity 
Currently it is believed that this pirate is only a character based on Amaro Pargo, since there are no real references either to his activities or to his execution in Tenerife. Yes, there was an offender in the 1920s who took that nickname.

See also 
 Amaro Pargo
 List of pirates

References 

1800 births
19th-century pirates
Executed mass murderers
People from Santa Cruz de Tenerife
People whose existence is disputed
Proslavery activists
Spanish pirates
Year of death missing
Spanish mass murderers